Bicentenary Medal may either refer to:
Bicentenary Medal of the Linnean Society
 Bicentenary Medal of the Royal Society of Arts